The Yorkshire Cup is an English Rugby Football Union competition founded in 1878. It is organised by the Yorkshire Rugby Football Union and is open to all eligible clubs in the Yorkshire area. It was initially known as the Yorkshire Challenge Cup.

The Yorkshire Senior Cup is currently the premier county cup competition for club sides based in Yorkshire that play in tier 4 (National League 2 North), tier 5 (National League 3 North) and tier 6 (North 1 East) of the English rugby union league system.  The current format is as a knock-out cup with a first round, second round, quarter-final, semi-final and final, which is to be played at neutral ground in the county.  Teams ranked lower than tier 6 play in the Yorkshire Shield or Yorkshire Trophy.

History

In 1877, despite reservations within the Rugby Football Union, the committee of the Yorkshire County Football Club (composed from the clubs of Bradford FC, Huddersfield FC, Leeds FC, Hull FC and York FC) sanctioned a knock-out tournament - the first of its kind in the UK.

The notion of competing for a trophy appealed to the public of Yorkshire as much as it appalled the guardians of amateurism. The proceeds from the final were distributed among local charities.The trophy itself is known as "T'owd Tin Pot", pronounced with a Yorkshire accent.

In the first season, 16 teams battled it out for the T'owd Tin Pot, with York eventually losing out to Halifax in the final.

In its early years the competition was dominated by clubs who now play rugby league. Since the schism of 1895 which led to the formation of the Northern Rugby Football Union and the development of rugby league football, the cup has been competed for by clubs who remained with the Rugby Football Union or were founded after 1895.

According to the Hallmarks on the trophy it was made by Martin, Hall & Co. Sheffield and London, in 1877. It is made of Sterling Silver .925.

The trophy was won by Morley Rugby Club in the two seasons prior to the Second World War, and was kept "in a drawer under the secretary's bed" for the duration of the war.

Finals

Results
§ Denotes club now defunct
± Denotes club plays rugby league following the schism
 Teams in bold are active clubs currently competing in rugby union competitions.

See also
 Yorkshire RFU
 Rugby league county cups

Bibliography
 Cup final programmes, including the 1978 Centenary Programme.
 Wakefield Rugby Football Club—1901-2001 A Centenary History. Written and compiled by David Ingall in 2001.
 Yorkshire Rugby Union Centenary 1869-1969 book produced by Yorkshire RFU.

Notes

References

External links
 Yorkshire Cup results on Yorkshire RU

Rugby union cup competitions in England
Recurring sporting events established in 1878
Cup